The Army Mountain Warfare School (AMWS) is a United States Army school located at the Camp Ethan Allen Training Site, Jericho, Vermont to train soldiers in mountain warfare, the specialized skills required for operating in mountainous terrain. It is home to the 86th Infantry Brigade Combat Team. The school is located in Vermont's Green Mountains.

Purpose
The school teaches a number of courses to train soldiers of the army (including Active Duty, the Army Reserve, Army National Guard, and ROTC cadets) in military operations in mountainous areas. Graduates of the Basic Military Mountaineer Course (BMMC) receive the special qualification identifier (SQI) of "E," Military Mountaineer.

The school runs 'summer' sessions focusing on rock climbing and high-angle tactical combat, and 'winter' courses that also include winter travel, camping, and survival skills.  The basic and advanced courses of instruction trains individual soldiers, not units. These soldiers then return to their units to provide at least some training and experience in mountain warfare throughout the U.S. Army.  Unit training, both at the AMWS and at the requesting unit's location, can also be provided.

Overview
The school was established in April 1983 to train members of the 3rd Battalion, 172nd Infantry Regiment (Mountain) then consisting of company-sized units from several New England states. Enrollment was opened over the years to include members of all branches of the armed services, Federal law enforcement and foreign armies. The curriculum design broadens the soldier's knowledge and unit’s capabilities. The curriculum is designed to enable the soldier to operate in mountains and cold and to enable him to assist in planning operations. The school uses a small group participatory learning process.

The school conducts six courses of instruction from basic military mountaineering to specialized advanced mountaineering related courses. Each level is to prepare soldiers to operate in mountains year-round and in cold, snowy, and/or icy environments. The Army Mountain Warfare School is one of three institutions that awards the Skill Qualification Identifier (SQI) "E," Military Mountaineer; the other two being graduates of the Northern Warfare Training Center's Basic Military Mountaineering Course (BMMC)—conducted by the 11th Airborne Division in Black Rapids, Alaska—and the Special Forces Advanced Mountain Operations School—conducted by the John F. Kennedy Special Warfare Center and School in Estes Park, Colorado.

The school is the executive agent for military mountaineering for the United States Army Infantry School. The school is responsible for the content of Field Manual 3–97.61, Military Mountaineering. The school is the only non-European permanent member of the International Association of Military Mountain Schools (IAMMS).

The curriculum is broken down into a two-week course, with three general type of mountain-specific skills taught in each: individual, small unit, and medical. The Basic Military Mountaineer Course is a prerequisite to attend the Advanced Military Mountaineer Course. The training focus is on providing the force structure with soldiers capable of assisting their units in mountainous environments. Courses for the Basic and Advanced Mountaineering Courses run monthly from May through October and January through March.

It is very common for Army ROTC cadets to attend AMWS as a specialty school during ROTC. Cadets take the course during the summer as they are in school, and training during the school season. Other ROTC summer schools include: Airborne School, Air Assault School, Combat Diver Qualification Course, Drill Cadet Leadership Training, and Northern Warfare.

This school is not to be confused with the Mountain phase of Ranger School.

Courses
Basic Military Mountaineer Course: Combined both the summer and winter courses of instruction into one combined course that will cover components of each phase depending on the time of year. The purpose of the BMMC is to train soldiers in the skills required to conduct mountain combat operations during any climatic conditions and to award the SQI "E" upon graduation. The following are general subject areas taught during this course of instruction: mountain navigation skills, individual mountain skills, small unit mountain skills, mountain medical skills, and summer specific practical exercises.

Advanced Military Mountaineer Course (Summer): The purpose of the Advanced Military Mountaineer Course (Summer) is to train soldiers in the knowledge/skills required to lead small units/teams over technically difficult, hazardous or exposed (class 4 and 5) mountainous terrain during summer months.  Emphasis is placed on developing the level 2 assault climber tasks described in Chapter 2 of Army Field Manual 3-97.6, Mountain Operations (2000 Revision).

Advanced Military Mountaineer Course (Winter): The purpose of the Advanced Military Mountaineer Course (Winter) is to train soldiers in the skills required to lead small units over technically difficult, hazardous or exposed (class 4 and 5) mountainous terrain during cold weather climatic conditions.

Rough Terrain Evacuation Course: The purpose of the Rough Terrain Evacuation Course is to train soldiers the skills to care for and safely evacuate an injured soldier over difficult terrain under austere conditions.  The course combines classroom and field time with evacuation practical exercises.  Many portions of the course are physically demanding as soldiers apply their newly learned skills in various medical evacuation (MEDEVAC) scenarios.

Mountain Planners Course: The purpose of the Mountain Planners Course is to train mountain leaders the basic skills required to plan, support, and execute operations in mountainous terrain under various climatic conditions.  Students are subjected to effects of altitude/cold/terrain on: personnel, equipment, movement, patrolling, reconnaissance, fire control, casualty evacuation (CASEVAC), offensive/defensive operations, required/available equipment and its use, resupply considerations, and water procurement.  Practical exercises cover CASEVAC, patrolling, patrol base operations, rappelling, rope management, and route planning.

Mountain Rifleman Course: The purpose of the Mountain Rifleman Course is to train snipers and squad designated marksman a combination of mountain specific skills and angle marksmanship fundamentals.  The goal is improving mobility and lethality in mountainous terrain.  Soldiers are provided with extensive shooting opportunities at both flat and angle ranges.  Soldiers are taught basic mountain mobility and navigation skills.  The skills are then combined in practical exercises that test a student's ability to plan and execute missions in mountainous terrain.  The tasks taught are: mountain travel techniques, cold weather clothing, environmental injuries, soldier load management, characteristics of mountain terrain, basic mountaineering equipment, long range marksmanship in mountainous terrain, map reading in mountainous terrain, terrain exploitation, and land navigation.

See also
 List of mountain warfare forces
Mountain Warfare Training Center (United States Marine Corps)
Northern Warfare Training Center (United States Army)
Mountain Warfare Training Camp Michael Monsoor (United States Navy)
Russian Hatsavita Mountain Warfare Training (Russia)
Mountain Leader Training Cadre (UK)
High Mountain Military School (France)
High Altitude Warfare School (India)

References

External links 

Vermont National Guard

Buildings and structures in Jericho, Vermont
Education in Chittenden County, Vermont
Mountain warfare training installations
United States Army National Guard
United States Army schools
Military installations in Vermont